Peter Peak is a  mountain summit located west of the crest of the Sierra Nevada mountain range, in Fresno County of central California, United States. The John Muir Trail passes to the east, providing an approach. This geographical feature was named by the Sierra Club in 1938 in memory of one of their own, Peter Grubb (1919–1937), who made the first ascent of this peak in 1936. Peter died at Capri, age 18, while traveling on a bicycle tour of Italy. This mountain's name has been officially adopted by the United States Board on Geographic Names.

Climate
According to the Köppen climate classification system, Peter Peak is located in an alpine climate zone. Most weather fronts originate in the Pacific Ocean, and travel east toward the Sierra Nevada mountains. As fronts approach, they are forced upward by the peaks, causing them to drop their moisture in the form of rain or snowfall onto the range (orographic lift). Precipitation runoff from this mountain drains into tributaries of the San Joaquin River.

See also

 List of mountain peaks of California
 Emerald Peak

References

External links

 Weather forecast: Peter Peak

Mountains of Fresno County, California
Mountains of Kings Canyon National Park
North American 3000 m summits
Mountains of Northern California
Sierra Nevada (United States)